The 1988 CFL season is considered to be the 35th season in modern-day Canadian football, although it is officially the 31st Canadian Football League season.

CFL News in 1988
The Canadian Football Network reached an agreement with the CFL to extend its network for two more seasons.

Game rosters were revised to consist of 20-Non Imports, 14-Imports and 2-Quarterbacks. The reserve list was lowered from 4 players to 2 players. In addition, if a team decided to dress 14-Imports, one of those imports had to be designated as a special teams player.

On Monday, December 12, the CFL Board of Governors appointed Roy McMurty as Chairman/Chief Executive Officer and Bill Baker as President/Chief Operating Officer, succeeding Douglas Mitchell as the league's commissioner (both McMurtry and Baker served as the league's de facto co-commissioners for the 1989 season). Their appointments were confirmed on Sunday, January 1, 1989. The CFL Board of Governors also approved the sale of the Toronto Argonauts from Carling O'Keefe Breweries to Harry Ornest.

Regular season standings

Final regular season standings
Note: GP = Games Played, W = Wins, L = Losses, T = Ties, PF = Points For, PA = Points Against, Pts = Points

Bold text means that they have clinched the playoffs.
Edmonton and Toronto have first round byes.

Grey Cup playoffs

The Winnipeg Blue Bombers were the 1988 Grey Cup champions, defeating the BC Lions 22–21, at Ottawa's Lansdowne Park.  This was the first Grey Cup game between two teams from west of Ontario, and the first to be won by a team which had only a .500 season. The Blue Bombers' James Murphy (WR) was named the Grey Cup's Most Valuable Player on Offence and Michael Gray (DT) was named Grey Cup's Most Valuable Player on Defence, while Bob Cameron (P) was named the Grey Cup's Most Valuable Canadian.

Playoff bracket

CFL Leaders
 CFL Passing Leaders
 CFL Rushing Leaders
 CFL Receiving Leaders

1988 CFL All-Stars

Offence
QB – Matt Dunigan, BC Lions
RB – Anthony Cherry, BC Lions
RB – Gill Fenerty, Toronto Argonauts
SB – Ray Elgaard, Saskatchewan Roughriders
SB – Emanuel Tolbert, Calgary Stampeders
WR – David Williams, BC Lions
WR – James Murphy, Winnipeg Blue Bombers
C – Ian Beckstead, Toronto Argonauts
OG – Roger Aldag, Saskatchewan Roughriders
OG – Gerald Roper, BC Lions
OT – Chris Schultz, Toronto Argonauts
OT – Jim Mills, BC Lions

Defence
DT – Mike Walker, Hamilton Tiger-Cats
DT – Brett Williams, Edmonton Eskimos
DE – Grover Covington, Hamilton Tiger-Cats
DE – Bobby Jurasin, Saskatchewan Roughriders
LB – Danny Bass, Edmonton Eskimos
LB – Greg Stumon, BC Lions
LB – Willie Pless, Toronto Argonauts
CB – Stanley Blair, Edmonton Eskimos
CB – Reggie Pleasant, Toronto Argonauts
DB – Selwyn Drain, Toronto Argonauts
DB – Howard Fields, Hamilton Tiger-Cats
DS – Bennie Thompson, Winnipeg Blue Bombers

Special teams
P – Bob Cameron, Winnipeg Blue Bombers
K – Dave Ridgway, Saskatchewan Roughriders
ST – Earl Winfield, Hamilton Tiger-Cats

1988 Eastern All-Stars

Offence
QB – Gilbert Renfroe, Toronto Argonauts
RB – Orville Lee, Ottawa Rough Riders
RB – Gill Fenerty, Toronto Argonauts
SB – Gerald Alphin, Ottawa Rough Riders
SB – Darrell Smith, Toronto Argonauts
WR – Earl Winfield, Hamilton Tiger-Cats
WR – James Murphy, Winnipeg Blue Bombers
C – Ian Beckstead, Toronto Argonauts
OG – Nick Bastaja, Winnipeg Blue Bombers
OG – Jason Riley, Hamilton Tiger-Cats
OT – Chris Schultz, Toronto Argonauts
OT – Miles Gorrell, Hamilton Tiger-Cats

Defence
DT – Mike Walker, Hamilton Tiger-Cats
DT – Rodney Harding, Toronto Argonauts
DE – Grover Covington, Hamilton Tiger-Cats
DE – Glen Kulka, Toronto Argonauts
LB – James West, Winnipeg Blue Bombers
LB – Don Moen, Toronto Argonauts
LB – Willie Pless, Toronto Argonauts
CB – James Jefferson, Winnipeg Blue Bombers
CB – Reggie Pleasant, Toronto Argonauts
DB – Selwyn Drain, Toronto Argonauts
DB – Howard Fields, Hamilton Tiger-Cats
DS – Bennie Thompson, Winnipeg Blue Bombers

Special teams
P – Bob Cameron, Winnipeg Blue Bombers
K – Lance Chomyc, Toronto Argonauts
ST – Earl Winfield, Hamilton Tiger-Cats

1988 Western All-Stars

Offence
QB – Matt Dunigan, BC Lions
RB – Anthony Cherry, BC Lions
RB – Anthony Parker, BC Lions
SB – Ray Elgaard, Saskatchewan Roughriders
SB – Emanuel Tolbert, Calgary Stampeders
WR – David Williams, BC Lions
WR – Larry Willis, Calgary Stampeders
C – Mike Anderson, Toronto Argonauts
OG – Roger Aldag, Saskatchewan Roughriders
OG – Gerald Roper, BC Lions
OT – Hector Pothier, Edmonton Eskimos
OT – Jim Mills, BC Lions

Defence
DT – Gary Lewis, Saskatchewan Roughriders
DT – Brett Williams, Edmonton Eskimos
DE – Vince Goldsmith, Saskatchewan Roughriders
DE – Bobby Jurasin, Saskatchewan Roughriders
LB – Danny Bass, Edmonton Eskimos
LB – Greg Stumon, BC Lions
LB – Ken Ford, Calgary Stampeders
CB – Stanley Blair, Edmonton Eskimos
CB – Larry Crawford, BC Lions
DB – Richie Hall, Saskatchewan Roughriders
DB – Chris Major, Calgary Stampeders
DS – Don Wilson, Edmonton Eskimos

Special teams
P – Jerry Kauric, Edmonton Eskimos
K – Dave Ridgway, Saskatchewan Roughriders
ST – Henry Williams, Edmonton Eskimos

1988 CFL Awards
CFL's Most Outstanding Player Award – David Williams (WR), BC Lions
CFL's Most Outstanding Canadian Award – Ray Elgaard (SB), Saskatchewan Roughriders
CFL's Most Outstanding Defensive Player Award – Grover Covington (DE), Hamilton Tiger-Cats
CFL's Most Outstanding Offensive Lineman Award – Roger Aldag (OG), Saskatchewan Roughriders
CFL's Most Outstanding Rookie Award – Orville Lee (RB), Ottawa Rough Riders
CFLPA's Outstanding Community Service Award – Hector Pothier (OT), Edmonton Eskimos
CFL's Coach of the Year – Mike Riley, Winnipeg Blue Bombers

References 

CFL
Canadian Football League seasons